In the international petroleum industry, crude oil products are traded on various oil bourses based on established chemical profiles, delivery locations, and financial terms. The chemical profiles, or crude oil assays, specify important properties such as the oil's API gravity. The delivery locations are usually sea ports close to the oil fields from which the crude was obtained (and new fields are constantly being explored), and the pricing is usually quoted based on FOB (free on board, without consideration of final delivery costs).

Benchmarks

The three most quoted oil products are North America's West Texas Intermediate crude (WTI), North Sea Brent Crude, and the UAE Dubai Crude, and their pricing is used as a barometer for the entire petroleum industry, although, in total, there are 46 key oil exporting countries. Brent Crude is typically priced at about $2 over the WTI Spot price, which is typically priced $5 to $6 above the EIA's Imported Refiner Acquisition Cost (IRAC) and OPEC Basket prices.  WTI and Brent are quoted FOB specific locations, not FOB the oilfields.  For WTI, the delivery point is Cushing, OK; for Brent, it is Sullom Voe, located in Shetland, an island archipelago north of mainland Scotland.

Although crude oil assays evaluate various chemical properties of the oil, the two most important properties determining a crude's value are its density (measured as API specific gravity) and its sulphur content (measured per mass). Crude oil is considered "heavy" if it has long hydrocarbon chains, or "light" if it has short hydrocarbon chains: an API gravity of 34 or higher is "light", between 31 and 33 is "medium", and 30 or below is "heavy".
Crude is considered "sweet" if it is low in sulphur content (< 0.5%/weight), or "sour" if high (> 1.0%/weight). Generally, the higher the API gravity (the "lighter" it is), the more valuable the crude.

List of crude oil products

References

Sources
U.S. Energy Information Administration: World Crude Oil Prices 
BP Crude Grades
Intertek: Crude Oil Grades and Types
MeGlobalOil: Carriage of Heavy Grade Oil
Statoil.com: Crude oil assays
EnergyIntel.com: The Crude Oils and their Key Characteristics
Capline system crude oil properties and quality indicators

Petroleum industry
Energy-related lists